Andriy Oleksiyovych Protsenko (born 20 May 1988) is a Ukrainian high jumper. He is the 2022 World bronze medallist, 2014 World Indoor bronze medallist and European silver medallist.

Career
He won the silver medal at the 2007 European Junior Championships, and the bronze medal at the 2009 European U23 Championships. He competed at the 2009 World Championships without reaching the final. He also competed at the 2011, 2013 and 2015 World Championships also without reaching the final.

His personal best jump is 2.40 metres, achieved in July 2014 in Lausanne. He became only 12th person in the history of men's high jump to jump over 2.40.

He won the 2019 Diamond League final in Zurich, with his season best of 2.32 m, which gave him a wild card entry for the 2019 World Athletics Championships in Doha.

Protsenko won a bronze medal at the 2022 World Athletics Championships in Eugene, United States. He said in his interview that he spent nearly 40 days in occupied Kherson Oblast before he was able to safely leave it. He spent those days in a village where he made improvised facilities to continue his trainings. After he left Ukraine to get prepared for the Worlds, he first trained in Portugal and then in Spain. He also mentioned in his interview that Gianmarco Tamberi, who also showed his support of Ukraine at the 2022 World Athletics Indoor Championships, supported and helped him a lot.

Competition record

Personal life
Protsenko is married, has a daughter and resides with his family in Kherson.

References

External links

1988 births
Living people
Sportspeople from Kherson
Ukrainian male high jumpers
Athletes (track and field) at the 2012 Summer Olympics
Athletes (track and field) at the 2016 Summer Olympics
Athletes (track and field) at the 2020 Summer Olympics
Olympic athletes of Ukraine
World Athletics Championships athletes for Ukraine
European Athletics Championships medalists
Universiade medalists in athletics (track and field)
Universiade silver medalists for Ukraine
Athletes (track and field) at the 2019 European Games
European Games medalists in athletics
European Games gold medalists for Ukraine
Diamond League winners
Ukrainian Athletics Championships winners
Competitors at the 2011 Summer Universiade
Medalists at the 2013 Summer Universiade
21st-century Ukrainian people